Fairview Schoolhouse is located in the Columbia section of Knowlton Township, Warren County, New Jersey, United States. The schoolhouse was added to the National Register of Historic Places on August 12, 1977.

See also
National Register of Historic Places listings in Warren County, New Jersey

References

Defunct schools in New Jersey
Knowlton Township, New Jersey
National Register of Historic Places in Warren County, New Jersey
School buildings on the National Register of Historic Places in New Jersey
School buildings completed in 1835
Schools in Warren County, New Jersey
New Jersey Register of Historic Places